Wilhelm Eugen Johansen (1 February 1892 – 31 December 1973) was a Norwegian horse rider who competed in the 1920 Summer Olympics, in the 1928 Summer Olympics, and in the 1936 Summer Olympics.

In 1920 he and his horse Nökken finished eleventh in the individual eventing. The Norwegian eventing team did not finish the team eventing competition, because only two riders were able to finish the individual competition. Johnsen and Nökken also participated in the individual jumping event and finished 13th.

Eight years later he and his horse Baby won the silver medal as member of the Norwegian eventing team in the team eventing competition after finishing 27th in the individual eventing.

In 1936 he and his horse Sorte Mand finished seventh as part of the Norwegian dressage team in the team dressage competition, after finishing 20th in the individual dressage event.

Johansen held the rank of Rittmester in the Norwegian Army, and fought with the 2nd Division in the 1940 Norwegian Campaign. In 1943 he was arrested by the Germans and sent as a prisoner of war to Germany, being released at the end of the Second World War.

References

External links
profile

1892 births
1973 deaths
Norwegian male equestrians
Event riders
Norwegian dressage riders
Show jumping riders
Olympic equestrians of Norway
Equestrians at the 1920 Summer Olympics
Equestrians at the 1928 Summer Olympics
Equestrians at the 1936 Summer Olympics
Olympic silver medalists for Norway
Olympic medalists in equestrian
Norwegian Army personnel of World War II
Norwegian prisoners of war in World War II
World War II prisoners of war held by Germany
Medalists at the 1928 Summer Olympics
Sportspeople from Oslo